'Alfred Cheung  (born 28 December 1955) is a Chinese actor, director, writer and producer.

Early life
Cheung's mother, with one suitcase and two children, left their hometown in China in order to find better opportunities in Hong Kong. Cheung grew up in a poor neighborhood in Hong Kong. Cheung's mother made a living working as a bar girl and domestic helper.

Upon graduating in the Chinese Language & Literature major from Hong Kong Baptist University, Cheung earned a diploma in film production from the Chinese University of Hong Kong (Extramural studies). Cheung has been involved in the movie-making industry since he was young and attended The New School in New York, pursuing advanced studies in the Art of Movies.

Career
He has been a scriptwriter since 1981, including 'The Story of Woo Viet' and 'Father & Son'. 
In 1983, he took the dual role of scriptwriter and director in the film  'Let's Make Laugh', which won him the 'Best Screenplay' and his leading actress won " The Best Actress" at the 3rd Hong Kong Film Awards.

In 1990, Alfred Cheung produced and directed a political satire movie, "Her Fatal Ways", which film won another "Best Screenplay" and "Best Actress" for DoDo Cheng.

Cheung has developed comedy projects and has worked  as producer, scriptwriter, actor and director.

In 2008, Cheung graduated from the EMBA of HKUST.
In 2010, Cheung attended a DBA course run by Victoria University, Switzerland organized by Beijing University.
Within three years, Cheung had directed two films in Mainland China: "Contract Lover" and" Love At Seventh Sight".

Non-film work
In addition, Cheung is involved in other mass media: TV, radio, advertising and publishing as well as IT platforms, F&B and drama training workshops.

In 1996, Cheung founded 'entertainment.com', a showbiz web page.

He founded 'Alfred Cheung's Acting Studio'. Through dramatic training and role-play, participants learn how to appreciate customers' feelings and, ultimately, to build team spirit and enhance customer service standards.

Cheung is passionate in the performing arts and how it can transform education. He is the chairman of Dramatic English, the leading education corporation in the Greater China region. 

Cheung also runs an F&B business, including a Cantonese restaurant chain with branches named after his movies such as 'Cousin Cafe'.

Additionally, he has a weekly column in the newspaper Ming Pao and Apple Daily News, where he shares his views about politics, economics and family.

He wrote a book called ”Doubt 爸聲“  in which he frames his experiences as the 'CEO' of his family and lessons he learnt from being a father.

Personal life
Cheung's wife is Cindy Yeung, CEO of Emperor Watch & Jewelry. Cheung has three children Justin, Jasmine and Jonathan. Cheung's son Jonathan plays football for the Hong Kong Kitchee Football Club.

Filmography

Films 
 Goodbye UFO (2019)
 77 Heartwarmings (2019)
 Big Brother (2018)
 Z Storm (2014)
 I Love Hong Kong 2013 (2013)
 Love Is... Pyjamas (2012)
 I Love Hong Kong 2012 (2012)

References

External links
 Internet Movie Database

1955 births
Living people
Hong Kong film directors
Alumni of Hong Kong Baptist University
Alumni of the Hong Kong University of Science and Technology
Hong Kong male film actors